John "Jack" Dunne (1890–1974) was an Irish footballer who made 23 appearances in the Football League playing for Lincoln City as a full back. Before joining Lincoln, he played in the Irish Football League for Shelbourne, was a member of their 1911 IFA Cup-winning team, and was capped once for the Irish League representative team, in November 1913 against the Scottish League XI. He went on to play for Southern League club Mid Rhondda and for Boston Town and Horncastle Town.

References

1890 births
1974 deaths
Association footballers from County Dublin
Irish association footballers (before 1923)
Association football fullbacks
Shelbourne F.C. players
Lincoln City F.C. players
Mid Rhondda F.C. players
NIFL Premiership players
English Football League players
Date of birth missing
Date of death missing
Place of death missing
Irish League representative players